Aleksandr Borisovich Stolper (12 August 1907, in Dvinsk (now Daugavpils) – 12 January 1979, in Moscow) was a Soviet film director and screenwriter. He directed 14 films between 1940 and 1977. Aleksandr Stolper was awarded the Stalin Prize in 1949 and 1951 and received the honorary title People's Artist of the USSR in 1977.

Filmography
The Law of Life (1940)
Lad from Our Town (1942)
Wait for Me (1943)
Days and Nights (1945)
Our Heart (1946)
Tale of a True Man (1948)
Far from Moscow (1950)
The Road (1955)
A Unique Spring (1957)
Hard Happiness (1958)
The Alive and the Dead (1964)
Retribution (1967)
The Fourth (1972)
Slope: Zero (1977)

References

External links

Soviet film directors
Soviet screenwriters
Male screenwriters
People's Artists of the USSR
Stalin Prize winners
Gerasimov Institute of Cinematography alumni
Academic staff of the Gerasimov Institute of Cinematography
1907 births
1979 deaths
Writers from Daugavpils
Soviet drama teachers
Academic staff of High Courses for Scriptwriters and Film Directors
Recipients of the Vasilyev Brothers State Prize of the RSFSR
Burials at Vvedenskoye Cemetery